A constitutional referendum was held in Niger on 31 October 2010, after the military coup earlier in the year had ousted elected President Mamadou Tandja. General elections followed on 31 January and 12 March 2011. Approved by 90% of voters, the constitution granted immunity to the coup leaders and stipulated that they had to hand over power by 6 April 2011. They did so as promised following the January–March 2011 general elections. The approval of the referendum also restored the semi-presidential system of government which had been abolished in the disputed referendum in 2009.

Results

References

2010 in Niger
2010 referendums
2010
Constitutional referendums in Niger